This is a list of probability topics, by Wikipedia page.
It overlaps with the (alphabetical) list of statistical topics. There are also the outline of probability and catalog of articles in probability theory. For distributions, see List of probability distributions. For journals, see list of probability journals. For contributors to the field, see list of mathematical probabilists and list of statisticians.

General aspects
 Probability
 Randomness, Pseudorandomness, Quasirandomness
 Randomization, hardware random number generator
 Random number generation
 Random sequence
 Uncertainty
 Statistical dispersion
 Observational error
 Equiprobable
 Equipossible
 Average
 Probability interpretations
 Markovian
 Statistical regularity
 Central tendency
 Bean machine
 Relative frequency
 Frequency probability
 Maximum likelihood
 Bayesian probability
 Principle of indifference
 Credal set
 Cox's theorem
 Principle of maximum entropy
 Information entropy
 Urn problems
 Extractor
 Aleatoric, aleatoric music
 Free probability
 Exotic probability
 Schrödinger method
 Empirical measure
 Glivenko–Cantelli theorem
 Zero–one law
 Kolmogorov's zero–one law
 Hewitt–Savage zero–one law
 Law of truly large numbers
 Littlewood's law
 Infinite monkey theorem
 Littlewood–Offord problem
 Inclusion–exclusion principle
 Impossible event
 Information geometry
 Talagrand's concentration inequality

Foundations of probability theory
 Probability theory
 Probability space
 Sample space
 Standard probability space
 Random element
 Random compact set
 Dynkin system
 Probability axioms
 Normalizing constant
 Event (probability theory)
 Complementary event
 Elementary event
 Mutually exclusive
 Boole's inequality
 Probability density function
 Cumulative distribution function
 Law of total cumulance
 Law of total expectation
 Law of total probability
 Law of total variance
 Almost surely
 Cox's theorem
 Bayesianism
 Prior probability
 Posterior probability
 Borel's paradox
 Bertrand's paradox
 Coherence (philosophical gambling strategy)
 Dutch book
 Algebra of random variables
 Belief propagation
 Transferable belief model
 Dempster–Shafer theory
 Possibility theory

Random variables
 Discrete random variable
 Probability mass function
 Constant random variable
 Expected value
 Jensen's inequality
 Variance
 Standard deviation
 Geometric standard deviation
 Multivariate random variable
 Joint probability distribution
 Marginal distribution
 Kirkwood approximation
 Independent identically-distributed random variables
 Independent and identically-distributed random variables
 Statistical independence
 Conditional independence
 Pairwise independence
 Covariance
 Covariance matrix
 De Finetti's theorem
 Correlation
 Uncorrelated
 Correlation function
 Canonical correlation
 Convergence of random variables
 Weak convergence of measures
 Helly–Bray theorem
 Slutsky's theorem
 Skorokhod's representation theorem
 Lévy's continuity theorem
 Uniform integrability
 Markov's inequality
 Chebyshev's inequality = Chernoff bound
 Chernoff's inequality
 Bernstein inequalities (probability theory)
 Hoeffding's inequality
 Kolmogorov's inequality
 Etemadi's inequality
 Chung–Erdős inequality
 Khintchine inequality
 Paley–Zygmund inequality
 Laws of large numbers
 Asymptotic equipartition property
 Typical set
 Law of large numbers
 Kolmogorov's two-series theorem
 Random field
 Conditional random field
 Borel–Cantelli lemma
 Wick product

Conditional probability
 Conditioning (probability)
 Conditional expectation
 Conditional probability distribution
 Regular conditional probability
 Disintegration theorem
 Bayes' theorem
 de Finetti's theorem
 Exchangeable random variables
 Rule of succession
 Conditional independence
 Conditional event algebra
 Goodman–Nguyen–van Fraassen algebra

Theory of probability distributions
 Probability distribution
 Probability distribution function
 Probability density function
 Probability mass function
 Cumulative distribution function
 Quantile
 Moment (mathematics)
 Moment about the mean
 Standardized moment
 Skewness
 Kurtosis
 Locality
 Cumulant
 Factorial moment
 Expected value
 Law of the unconscious statistician
 Second moment method
 Variance
 Coefficient of variation
 Variance-to-mean ratio
 Covariance function
 An inequality on location and scale parameters
 Taylor expansions for the moments of functions of random variables
 Moment problem
 Hamburger moment problem
 Carleman's condition
 Hausdorff moment problem
 Trigonometric moment problem
 Stieltjes moment problem
 Prior probability distribution
 Total variation distance
 Hellinger distance
 Wasserstein metric
 Lévy–Prokhorov metric
 Lévy metric
 Continuity correction
 Heavy-tailed distribution
 Truncated distribution
 Infinite divisibility
 Stability (probability)
 Indecomposable distribution
 Power law
 Anderson's theorem
 Probability bounds analysis
 Probability box

Properties of probability distributions 
 Central limit theorem
 Illustration of the central limit theorem
 Concrete illustration of the central limit theorem
 Berry–Esséen theorem
 Berry–Esséen theorem
 De Moivre–Laplace theorem
 Lyapunov's central limit theorem
 Martingale central limit theorem
 Infinite divisibility (probability)
 Method of moments (probability theory)
 Stability (probability)
 Stein's lemma
 Characteristic function (probability theory)
 Lévy continuity theorem
 Darmois–Skitovich theorem
 Edgeworth series
 Helly–Bray theorem
 Kac–Bernstein theorem
 Location parameter
 Maxwell's theorem
 Moment-generating function
 Factorial moment generating function
 Negative probability
 Probability-generating function
 Vysochanskiï–Petunin inequality
 Mutual information
 Kullback–Leibler divergence
 Normally distributed and uncorrelated does not imply independent
 Le Cam's theorem
 Large deviations theory
 Contraction principle (large deviations theory)
 Varadhan's lemma
 Tilted large deviation principle
 Rate function
 Laplace principle (large deviations theory)
 Exponentially equivalent measures
 Cramér's theorem (second part)

Applied probability
 Empirical findings
 Benford's law
 Pareto principle
 Zipf's law
Boy or Girl paradox

Stochastic processes
 Adapted process
 Basic affine jump diffusion
 Bernoulli process
 Bernoulli scheme
 Branching process
 Point process
 Chapman–Kolmogorov equation
 Chinese restaurant process
 Coupling (probability)
 Ergodic theory
 Maximal ergodic theorem
 Ergodic (adjective)
 Galton–Watson process
 Gauss–Markov process
 Gaussian process
 Gaussian random field
 Gaussian isoperimetric inequality
 Large deviations of Gaussian random functions
 Girsanov's theorem
 Hawkes process
 Increasing process
 Itô's lemma
 Jump diffusion
 Law of the iterated logarithm
 Lévy flight
 Lévy process
 Loop-erased random walk
 Markov chain
 Examples of Markov chains
 Detailed balance
 Markov property
 Hidden Markov model
 Maximum-entropy Markov model
 Markov chain mixing time
 Markov partition
 Markov process
 Continuous-time Markov process
 Piecewise-deterministic Markov process
 Martingale
 Doob martingale
 Optional stopping theorem
 Martingale representation theorem
 Azuma's inequality
 Wald's equation
 Poisson process
 Poisson random measure
 Population process
 Process with independent increments
 Progressively measurable process
 Queueing theory
 Erlang unit
 Random walk
 Random walk Monte Carlo
 Renewal theory
 Skorokhod's embedding theorem
 Stationary process
 Stochastic calculus
 Itô calculus
 Malliavin calculus
 Stratonovich integral
 Time series analysis
 Autoregressive model
 Moving average model
 Autoregressive moving average model
 Autoregressive integrated moving average model
 Anomaly time series
 Voter model
 Wiener process
 Brownian motion
 Geometric Brownian motion
 Donsker's theorem
 Empirical process
 Wiener equation
 Wiener sausage

Geometric probability
 Buffon's needle
 Integral geometry
 Hadwiger's theorem
 Wendel's theorem

Gambling
 Luck
 Game of chance
 Odds
 Gambler's fallacy
 Inverse gambler's fallacy
 Parrondo's paradox
 Pascal's wager
 Gambler's ruin
 Poker probability
 Poker probability (Omaha)
 Poker probability (Texas hold 'em)
 Pot odds
 Roulette
 Martingale (betting system)
 The man who broke the bank at Monte Carlo
 Lottery
 Lottery machine
 Pachinko
 Coherence (philosophical gambling strategy)
 Coupon collector's problem

Coincidence
 Birthday paradox
 Birthday problem
 Index of coincidence
 Bible code
 Spurious relationship
 Monty Hall problem

Algorithmics
 Probable prime
 Probabilistic algorithm = Randomised algorithm
 Monte Carlo method
 Las Vegas algorithm
 Probabilistic Turing machine
 Stochastic programming
 Probabilistically checkable proof
 Box–Muller transform
 Metropolis algorithm
 Gibbs sampling
 Inverse transform sampling method
 Walk-on-spheres method

Financial mathematics
 Risk
 Value at risk
 Market risk
 Risk-neutral measure
 Volatility
 Technical analysis
 Kelly criterion

Genetics
 Punnett square
 Hardy–Weinberg principle
 Ewens's sampling formula
 Population genetics

Historical
 History of probability
 The Doctrine of Chances

Mathematics-related lists
Statistics-related lists
Lists of topics